Tingotingo is a genus of Polynesian shield spiders. It was first described by Gustavo Hormiga and N. Scharff in 2020, and it has only been found in New Zealand.

Species
 it contains four species:
T. aho Hormiga & Scharff, 2020 – New Zealand
T. porotiti Hormiga & Scharff, 2020 (type) – New Zealand
T. pouaru Hormiga & Scharff, 2020 – New Zealand
T. tokorera Hormiga & Scharff, 2020 – New Zealand

See also
 List of Malkaridae species

References

Malkaridae genera
Spiders of New Zealand